Staats is a surname and given name.

Staats may also refer to:

 Staats, Saxony-Anhalt, German village
 Staats House (disambiguation), name of several buildings in the U.S.
 Hofje van Staats, hofje in the Netherlands
 Staats Island, uninhabited island in the Falkland Islands